Drymobius melanotropis, commonly known as the black forest racer, is a species of nonvenomous colubrid snake endemic to Central America.

Geographic range
It ranges through Costa Rica, Honduras, Nicaragua, and Panama.

Description
Drymobius melanotropis is green above, with black on the keels of the median three dorsal rows. The green color extends to the outer fourth of the ventral shields, and the center of the belly is yellow. Adults are about 1.25 m (50 in.) in total length.

References

Further reading
 Cope, E.D. 1876. On the Batrachia and Reptilia of Costa Rica. With Notes on the Herpetology and Ichthyology of Nicaragua and Peru. Journ. Acad. Nat. Sci. Philadelphia, series 2, 8 [1875]: 93-154. (Dendrophidium melanotropis, pp. 134–135.)

External links

Colubrids
Reptiles described in 1876
Reptiles of Central America
Reptiles of Mexico